Lygodactylus intermedius is a species of gecko endemic to Madagascar.

References

Lygodactylus
Reptiles described in 1995
Reptiles of Madagascar
Endemic fauna of Madagascar